Blush is the second extended play (EP) by English alternative rock band Wolf Alice. It was released on 7 October 2013 by Chess Club Records. The EP was produced by Austen Jux-Chandler. "She" was the first song to come from the EP, which was uploaded to the band's SoundCloud page.

Background
Shortly after the release of "Bros", also a Jux-Chandler production, Wolf Alice recorded new songs. On 15 August 2013, their new song, "She", premiered on Huw Stephens' radio show. Later on that day, the song was featured on the NME website, and was then later uploaded on SoundCloud by Wolf Alice. Pre-orders for the EP were put up on Rough Trade's website, which is on limited-edition 10-inch vinyl.

Track listing

Personnel
Credits adapted from the liner notes of Blush.

 Dan Grech – mixing
 Barry Grint – mastering
 Austen Jux-Chandler – engineering, production
 Tom Upex – assistant engineering

References

2013 debut EPs
Wolf Alice albums